Praboromarajchanok Institute is a public higher education institute for production of public health workforce under the Ministry of Public Health in Thailand. It named after the father of modern medicine and public health in Thailand, Prince Mahidol of Songkhla.

The institute was initially established in 1993 by Royal Decree as the "Institute for Health Workforce Development" under the Office of the Permanent Secretary, Ministry of Public Health which later renamed it as "Praboromarajchanok Institute" in 1995. The institute aims to produce and develop a workforce to serve the shortage of healthcare personnel of the Ministry of Public Health, educate and promote academic and profession, teach, research, provide social services, as well as to support religion, arts, culture, environment, and sports. In order to increase efficiency, the parliament enacted the Praboromarajchanok Institute Act B.E. 2562, giving it official higher educational institute status and more freedom in its administration.

References 

Institutes of higher education in Thailand
Ministry of Public Health (Thailand)
Educational institutions established in 1993
1993 establishments in Thailand